Lucie Durbiano (born 12 October 1969) is a French comic book artist and illustrator.

She was born in Castelsarrasin and grew up in the south of France. She began working as an illustrator of children's books in 1999. She began working with comics in 2001, contributing to the Tohu Revue collection. Her strip Les Super Super with Laurence Gillot appears in Astrapi and has been published in book form.

 Selected works 
 La Bise du Renne, children's book (1999), text by Laurence Gillot
 Lulu Grenadine, children's book series (2000-2007), text by Laurence Gillot
 Mastic, series
 Laurence, graphic novel (2004)
 Bizou, graphic novel (2004)
 Orage et désespoir, graphic novel (2006)
 Le Rouge Vous Va Si Bien, graphic novel (2007)
 Trésor, graphic novel (2009), selection of the Angoulême International Comics Festival
 Lo'', graphic novel (2010), selection of the Angoulême International Comics Festival

References 

1969 births
Living people
French children's book illustrators
French comics artists